Konardan (also Romanized as Konārdān) is a village in Jolgah Rural District, in the Central District of Jahrom County, Fars Province, Iran. At the 2006 census, its population was 793, in 199 families.

References 

Populated places in Jahrom County